Stephen Chow Sing-chi (born 22 June 1962), known professionally as Stephen Chow, is a Hong Kong filmmaker, former actor and comedian, known for Shaolin Soccer and Kung Fu Hustle.

Early life and education
Stephen Chow was born in Hong Kong on 22 June 1962 to Ling Po-yee, an alumna of Guangzhou Normal University, and Chow Yik-sheung, an immigrant from Ningbo, Zhejiang. Chow has an elder sister named Chow Man-kei and a younger sister named Chow Sing-ha. Chow's given name "Sing-chi" derives from Tang dynasty (618–907) Chinese poet Wang Bo's essay Preface to the Prince of Teng's Pavilion. After his parents divorced when he was seven, Chow was raised by his mother. Chow attended Heep Woh Primary School, a missionary school attached to the Hong Kong Council of the Church of Christ in China in Prince Edward Road, Kowloon Peninsula. When he was nine, he saw Bruce Lee's film The Big Boss, which inspired him to become a martial arts star. Chow entered San Marino Secondary School, where he studied alongside Lee Kin-yan. After graduation, he was accepted to TVB's acting classes.

Career
Chow began his career as an extra for Rediffusion Television. He later joined TVB in 1982. He was drawn to attention hosting the TVB Jade children's program 430 Space Shuttle.

Chow made his film debut in the 1988 film Final Justice, which won him the Golden Horse Award for Best Supporting Actor at the Golden Horse Awards.

Chow shot to stardom in The Final Combat (1989). The following decade, he appeared in more than 40 films. Fight Back to School (1991) became Hong Kong's top-grossing film of all time. In 1994, he began directing films, starting with From Beijing with Love. In the latter half of the 1990s, Chow becomes very famous in China, he became a legend and the Stephen Chow Phenomenon (周星驰现象).

2001–2010 International stardom 
In 2001, his film Shaolin Soccer grossed over US$50 million worldwide. Chow won Best Director and Best Actor at the 2002 Hong Kong Film Awards, and the film went on to garner additional awards including a Blue Ribbon Awards for Best Foreign Language Film and the Golden Bauhinia Award for Best Picture and Best Director. It was the highest-grossing Chinese film in Hong Kong at the time, grossing $46 million in the Asia region.

In 2004, his film Kung Fu Hustle grossed over US$106 million worldwide. Chow also won Best Director at the Taiwan Golden Horse Awards and Best Picture of Imagine Film Festival as well as over twenty international awards. Comedian Bill Murray said that the film was "the supreme achievement of the modern age in terms of comedy" .

His film CJ7 began filming in July 2006 in the eastern Chinese port of Ningbo. In August 2007, the film was given the title CJ7, a play on China's successful Shenzhou crewed space missions—Shenzhou 5 and Shenzhou 6. CJ7 became the highest-grossing film of all time in Malaysia.

For his work in comedy, he has received praise from notable institutions such as the Brooklyn Academy of Music, who called him the King of Comedy.

2010–present: Focus on directing 
In 2010, he became the executive director and major shareholder of 比高集團(BingoGroup Limited).

In 2013, his film Journey to the West: Conquering the Demons was the highest-grossing Chinese film of all time.

In 2016, his film The Mermaid broke numerous box office records, and became the highest-grossing film of all time in China. The Mermaid was released in Vietnam on 10 February 2016. On 14 March, it became the third-highest-grossing film of all time in Vietnam. It has now grossed over US$553.81 million worldwide. Chow became the ninth-top-grossing Hollywood Director in 2016.

Personal life
Chow dated Karen Mok, who has starred alongside him in several films. Chow had a ten-year relationship with Yu Wenfeng until 2010.

Filmography

As director

As actor

As producer only

Awards

See also
Sing girls
Cinema of China
Cinema of Hong Kong

References

Bibliography

External links

 
 
 

1962 births
Living people
Male actors from Zhejiang
Members of the Election Committee of Hong Kong, 2012–2017
20th-century Hong Kong male actors
21st-century Hong Kong male actors
Hong Kong film directors
Hong Kong film producers
Hong Kong screenwriters
Hong Kong male film actors
Hong Kong male television actors
Hong Kong male comedians
Hong Kong martial artists
Hong Kong philanthropists
Hong Kong television presenters
Hong Kong idols
TVB veteran actors